was a village located in Ama District, Aichi Prefecture, Japan.

As of 2003, the village had an estimated population of 5,687 and a density of 570.41 persons per km². The total area was 9.97 km².

On April 1, 2006, Jūshiyama was merged into the former town of Yatomi to create the city of Yatomi.

External links
 Yatomi official website 

Dissolved municipalities of Aichi Prefecture
Yatomi, Aichi